Sandovalina is a municipality in the state of São Paulo in Brazil. The population is 4,354 (2020 est.) in an area of 456 km². The elevation is 424 m.

References

Municipalities in São Paulo (state)